Kips Bay Brewing Company, also known as Kips Bay Brewing and Malting Co. and Patrick Skelly Brewery, was a brewery located in Manhattan, New York City that operated from 1894 to 1947. The former company's buildings have been repurposed into offices and are one of two groups of surviving brewery structures in Manhattan from the period when brewing was a major industry in the city.

History 

The brewery opened in 1894 on First Avenue between 37th and 38th streets and was originally named after Patrick Skelly, an Irishman who established the company. He renamed the business to Kips Bay Brewing Company the following year after the adjacent neighborhood of Kips Bay. Patrick died in 1908 and ownership of the brewery was turned over to his son Hugh, who served as its president until his death in 1943.

While the East Side of Manhattan was home to a number of large breweries in the late nineteenth and early twentieth centuries that took advantage of the East River for shipments of malt and hops by barge and the lagering of beer in the banks of the river, the Kips Bay Brewing Company was a neighborhood brewery that did not distribute its beer outside of Manhattan, catering only to patrons at its on-site taproom and to restaurants and saloons in the local area that were reachable by deliveries from the company’s horse drawn wagons.

In 1928, the brewery was shut down during Prohibition after a raid by federal agents discovered that five percent alcohol beer was being manufactured and smuggled out of the facility through garage doors that were camouflaged with brick and imitation steam and water pipes. The federal government seized the beer and took possession of the brewing equipment. The brewery reopened in 1934 after the repeal of Prohibition and remained in operation until 1947.

Redevelopment 

After the closure of the brewery, both of its seven story buildings managed to escape the wrecking ball and were subsequently converted into offices. These include 660 First Avenue at the southeast corner of 38th Street and 650 First Avenue at the northeast corner of 37th Street. Along with the former Yuengling Brewing complex on the Upper West Side, the Kips Bay Brewing Company is one of two groups of brewery buildings that survive in Manhattan from the period when brewing was a major industry in New York City. Each building has a copper-clad mansarded cupola in the French Second Empire style at the corner of the roof.

From 1953 to 1993, a major tenant in 660 First Avenue was CARE (Cooperative for Assistance and Relief Everywhere). The building served as CARE's United States headquarters for forty years until the organization moved to Atlanta. 660 First Avenue currently serves as medical office space for the nearby NYU Langone Health academic medical center. 650 First Avenue is a  building that also primarily accommodates medical office space. While the former brewery's large floors and windowless space would normally not be appealing to most businesses, the buildings' proximity to hospitals and other doctors made them attractive as medical office space.

References

Notes

Sources 
 

Beer brewing companies based in New York City
Murray Hill, Manhattan
1894 establishments in New York (state)
1947 disestablishments in New York (state)